Euphorbia pulvinata, commonly known as the pincushion euphorbia, is a species of plant in the family Euphorbiaceae native to southern Africa.

As most other succulent members of the genus Euphorbia, its trade is regulated under Appendix II of CITES.

References 

pulvinata
pulvinata